Juan del Castillo (1590?-1657?) - painter
Juan del Castillo (martyr) (1595-1628) - Jesuit saint killed in Paraguay
Juan del Castillo (bishop) (?-1593)